Donald Andrew Aslett (born 1935) is an American entrepreneur and author who specializes in cleaning and housekeeping products, services, and techniques. He co-founded Varsity House Cleaning Company, a house cleaning service, in 1957. After having been Varsity Contractors for years, it became Varsity Facility Services, a building service contractor, in 2011. It does business in the United States and Canada.

He is considered a cleaning expert, and has written books about how to reduce the time spent cleaning by reducing clutter, selecting and organizing the efficient cleaning tools, and creating what he calls a self-cleaning house.

In 2011, he opened the Museum of Clean in Pocatello, Idaho, a six-story building with a theater, art gallery, and collection of 6,000 artifacts. Both the museum and his house in Hawaii were designed to be low-maintenance and environmentally friendly, which resulted in an award from the state of Idaho for Aslett's efforts with the museum. The cleaning products sold by Varsity are also  "green", or environmentally-friendly.

Personal life
Aslett was born in 1935. His father raised wheat, beans, and potatoes. He served a church mission for the Church of Jesus Christ of Latter-day Saints in the Hawaiian Islands as a young man.

He married Barbara about 1957, when he started the cleaning business. They have six children and, while they were growing up, he was a scoutmaster. The house was photographed by the U.S. army to learn ways to create housing and barracks that are easy to maintain.

Aslett is a devout Mormon, and was a bishop in the Marsh Creek Ward in the McCammon Idaho Stake. He is on the Idaho State University Museum board.

Career

Varsity Facility Services

While studying at Idaho State College (now Idaho State University), Aslett formed Varsity House Cleaning Company, a janitorial service in Pocatello, Idaho, with and Arlo Luke in 1957 to help pay his college tuition. Aslett described his role as "crazy entrepreneur" and Luke as the "strong facilitator". What began as a part-time business grew to employ 30 to 50 people. One of their first business clients was Mountain State Telephone and Telegraph, now CenturyLink. Before they graduated, both men had a house and four children. The name of the organization became Varsity Contractors at some point.

Aslett received a Bachelor of Arts degree in Physical Education from Idaho State in 1963. He continued to operate the business, which employed 500 people, including college students. At that time, it operated in three states and was a janitorial, facilities services, and construction company. The company also offered landscaping services.

The company had 2,500 employees and operated in 14 states in 1990. It was a full-service janitorial contractor with total revenues $190 million in 2006. Arlo Luke, who had been the president and CEO for 28 years stepped down in 2011. Aslett was also not involved in the daily management of the organization by 2013.

In 2011, the company changed its name to Varsity Facility Services. Arlo's son, Eric became the company's president and CEO. Now, it operates in the United States and Canada as a "huge building service contractor specializing in regional and national facility portfolios", according to Lisa Ridgely of CleanLink. In 2013, it had offices in Canada and all 50 states and stores that sell their green products in 6 states. They employed 4,000 people at that time. Varsity is now headquartered in Salt Lake City, Utah.

Aslett was inducted into the Idaho's Hall of Fame in 2010. Three years later, both Luke and Aslett received awards from the International Sanitary Supply Association.

Author
Aslett, considered a cleaning expert, has written 40 books on the subject, which have been published in 10 languages. Michael Boyer states that he is one of the most prolific writers of cleaning books, which cover a wide range of topics like removing clutter, caring for specific materials, eliminating spots, and establishing processes for cleaning. There are books for household and professional cleaning.

Aslett says that the amount of time spent cleaning can be reduced 75% by if the homeowner were to reduce clutter, get the right cleaning tools, and make them accessible. One of his approaches is to develop a self-cleaning house, through the use of household items and flooring that are easy to maintain, and eliminating most of the dirt that comes into a house by taking one's shoes off at the door. Another way to manage cleanliness is to make each person responsible for cleaning up their own mess. He says that "even if President Bush stayed at my house, he'd know where the vacuum is."

He has acquired the nicknames of the Sultan of Shine, Don Juan of the John, and the Dean of Clean.

Museum of Clean

In November 2011, Aslett opened the Museum of Clean in a six-story building in Pocatello, Idaho, in what had been a warehouse built in 1915. It has an art gallery, 88-seat theater, and a gift shop. The museum features 6,000 historical artifacts related to cleanliness. Some of the unique items include a horse-drawn vacuum cleaner (1902), an early washing machine (1945), and a 1,600-year-old bronze toothpick. Interactive exhibits teach children how to recycle, clean their room, make their bed, and sweep. In addition to teaching recycling, the museum also has information about how to reduce waste. It cost $6 million to establish the museum and six years to assemble its collection. It was featured in a CBS News story in its "On the Road" series in 2012.

During an interview, Aslett states that "This is not a cleaning museum, it's the museum of clean." He believes that not being clean leads to depression, while removing clutter from ones' life means letting go of junk and a lifestyle of excess. He says, "nothing will change your life faster than when you throw away your junk. You have more time, you have more space, you feel better, you're healthier."

In preparation for its opening, the building was renovated to be environmentally friendly. During the renovation, 80% of the materials that were removed were recycled. The landscaping was designed to require little water. The museum has non-reflective windows and exterior LED lights, which are energy-saving. Its electric bill is about 25% of what it would have been without the modifications. A rainwater collection system supplies water for landscaping and toilets and some of the building's energy is supplied from its passive solar system. In 2013, he received the Pollution Prevention Champion Award from the Idaho Department of Environmental Quality for the environmental-friendly building.

Due to a grant from Monsanto, and in partnership with the Pocatello High School, a hydroponic greenhouse will be installed on the roof of the museum by 2017. It will teach students about green energy and how plants grow. Wind turbines and solar panels will generate power, such as to provide electricity for lights during the nighttime.

Other
By the mid-1990s, Aslett was appearing on a number of television shows, like The Oprah Winfrey Show, and made 5,000 appearances to talk about cleaning. To make his talks more interesting, he seeks to entertain, covering topics such as "Make Your House Do the Housework" and "Clean in a Minute". He has also served as a motivational speaker.

Notes

References

Further reading

External links
 Museum of Clean

1935 births
Living people
Idaho State University alumni
American motivational speakers
Latter Day Saints from Idaho
People from Pocatello, Idaho
Writers from Idaho
20th-century American businesspeople